2012: Time for Change is a 2010 feature-length documentary film directed by João G. Amorim. Based in part on the books of Daniel Pinchbeck, it premiered on April 9, 2010, at the Lumiere Theater in San Francisco. The film presents a positive alternative to apocalyptic doom and gloom, and features, among others, David Lynch, Sting, Elliot Page, Gilberto Gil, Barbara Marx Hubbard, Michael Dorsey and Paul Stamets.

External links
 
 
 Trailer: 

American documentary films
Documentary films about environmental issues
2010 documentary films
2010 films
Cultural depictions of Indira Gandhi
2010s English-language films
2010s American films